The first USS Nevada, a monitor, was ordered on 4 May 1898. She was awarded to the Bath Iron Works, Bath, Maine on 19 October 1898 and laid down as Connecticut, 17 April 1899. Connecticut was launched 24 November 1900; sponsored by Miss Grace Boutelle; renamed Nevada, January 1901; and commissioned on 5 March 1903, Commander Thomas B. Howard in command. The total cost for the hull, machinery, armor and armament was $1,851,313.22.

Nevada was renamed Tonopah in 1909 to free up the name for a new battleship.

Design

The s had been designed to combine a heavy striking power with easy concealment and negligible target area. She was manned by a total crew of 13 officers and 209 men.

Nevada was powered by two vertical triple expansion engines driving two screw propellers with steam generated by four Niclausse boilers.

The ship was armed with a main battery of two /40 caliber guns, either Mark 3 or Mark 4, in a Mark 4 turret. The secondary battery consisted of four /50 caliber Mark 7 guns along with three 6-pounder  guns. Nevada also had a  deck.

Service history

On 2 March 1909, the monitor was renamed Tonopah to allow Battleship Number 36 to be named Nevada. Assigned to the Atlantic Fleet's submarine force as a tender, Tonopah operated along the east coast from Massachusetts to Key West until January 1918. Then briefly assigned to Bermuda, she was ordered to Ponta Delgada, São Miguel Island, Azores in February.

In December, she was towed to Lisbon, and, upon her return to the United States, decommissioned at Philadelphia, Pennsylvania, on 1 July 1920.  She was one of several vessels sold on 26 January 1922, to Henry A. Hitner's Sons Company of Philadelphia.

Notes

Bibliography

Books

Online resources

External links 

World Battleships List: US "New Navy" Monitors

 

Arkansas-class monitors
Ships built in Bath, Maine
1900 ships
World War I monitors of the United States
Ships built by Bath Iron Works